KAMT (105.1 FM; "Blazin 105") is a Tejano formatted radio station serving Channing, Texas and Amarillo, Texas. The station is owned by Maria Ceniceros, through licensee Viva Media, LLC. Its transmitter is located south of Channing.

 at 10 p.m., the station was playing country music while stunting. On April 28, 2017, the station was re-branded Blazin 105, Tejano and More. Less than 60 days later, ownership made the decision to switch back to Regional Mexican, leaving staff unaware and unpaid. Previous formats included Spanish Pop and Regional Mexican.

References

External links
Blazin 105 Facebook

AMT
Country radio stations in the United States
Radio stations established in 2013
2013 establishments in Texas